Munaf may refer to:
 Munaf Patel, Indian cricket player
 Mohammad Munaf, Iraqi-American terror suspect
 Mohammad Munaf (cricketer), Pakistani cricket player
 Manaf (deity) (also Manaf), a pre-Islamic deity

See also
 Manaf (disambiguation)